Montrose in Forfarshire was a burgh constituency that elected one commissioner to the Parliament of Scotland and to the Convention of Estates.

At the time of the Acts of Union 1707, the commissioner for Montrose was chosen as one of the Scottish representatives to the first Parliament of Great Britain. From the 1708 British general election, Montrose, Aberdeen, Arbroath, Brechin and Inverbervie formed the Aberdeen district of burghs, returning one member between them to the House of Commons of Great Britain.

List of burgh commissioners
 1357: Richard of Cadyock and John Clerk
 1367: Eliseus Falconer and Thomas Black
 1504: George Stirling
 1543: John Ogilvy
 1563, 1567, 1568: John Erskine of Dun
 1568: the provost of Montrose, James Mason (in the absence of the provost)
 1569 convention: John Erskine of Dun
 1578 convention: — Leighton
 1579: George Petrie
 1581: Robert Leighton
 1583: James Mason
 1587: Robert Leighton
 1593: James Wishart
 1597 convention: William Murray
 1612: Patrick Leighton
 1615–16: James Mill
 1617 convention, 1617, 1621: William Ramsay
 1625 convention, 1628–33: Robert Keith
 1630 convention: Patrick Leighton
 1639–40: Robert Keith
 1643–44 convention: Andrew Gray
 1644: Robert Beattie
 1645: Robert Tailyour
 1645–47, 1648: James Pedie
 1649: Andrew Gray or James Milne
 1651: Walter Lyell
 1661: John Ronnald
 1665 convention, 1667 convention, 1669–74, 1678 convention: Robert Tailyour
 1681–82: Robert Rennald
 1685–86: James Mill, merchant, bailie 
 1689 (convention), 1689–1702: James Mudie
 1702–7: James Scott of Logie

References
 Joseph Foster, Members of Parliament, Scotland, 1882.

See also
 List of constituencies in the Parliament of Scotland at the time of the Union

Constituencies of the Parliament of Scotland (to 1707)
Politics of the county of Forfar
History of Angus, Scotland
Constituencies disestablished in 1707
1707 disestablishments in Scotland